Year 163 (CLXIII) was a common year starting on Friday (link will display the full calendar) of the Julian calendar. At the time, it was known as the Year of the Consulship of Laelianus and Pastor (or, less frequently, year 916 Ab urbe condita). The denomination 163 for this year has been used since the early medieval period, when the Anno Domini calendar era became the prevalent method in Europe for naming years.

Events 
 By place 

 Roman Empire 
 Marcus Statius Priscus re-conquers Armenia; the capital city of Artaxata is ruined.

Births 
 Cui Yan (or Jigui), Chinese official and politician (d. 216)
 Sun Shao (or Changxu), Chinese chancellor (d. 225)
 Tiberius Claudius Severus Proculus, Roman politician
 Xun Yu, Chinese politician and adviser (d. 212)

Deaths 
 Kong Zhou, father of Kong Rong (b. 103)
 Marcus Annius Libo, Roman politician

References 

 

als:160er#163